Celsense, Inc. is a privately held biotechnology company offering pre-clinical and clinical-grade imaging agents used to non-invasively detect, identify, quantify, and monitor cells and cellular activity. The company is based in Pittsburgh, Pennsylvania. It was founded in 2005 to commercialize imaging platforms developed at Carnegie Mellon University.  The company ceased operations on December 31, 2021.

Biotechnology companies of the United States
Companies based in Pittsburgh
Biotechnology companies established in 2005
2005 establishments in Pennsylvania